John Friedberg (born March 9, 1961) is an American Olympic saber fencer.

Early and personal life
Friedberg was born in Baltimore, Maryland, and is Jewish. He is the younger brother of Olympic fencer Paul Friedberg. He lives in Robbinsville Township, New Jersey.

Fencing career
Friedberg fenced for the University of North Carolina, took second in the NCAA Saber Championship in 1982, and won it as a senior in 1983. He was a three-time All American.

Friedberg won silver medal in team sabre at the 1991 Pan American Games and gold in the 1995 Pan American Games.

He competed in the team sabre event at the 1992 Summer Olympics. Friedberg came in second in the 1993 US Championship in sabre, and won the 1994 US Championship in sabre.

Friedberg founded and is head coach of the Fencing Club of Mercer County in New Jersey.

See also
 List of USFA Division I National Champions

References

External links
 

1961 births
Living people
Jewish male sabre fencers
Jewish American sportspeople
American male sabre fencers
Olympic fencers of the United States
Fencers at the 1992 Summer Olympics
Sportspeople from Baltimore
Pan American Games medalists in fencing
Pan American Games gold medalists for the United States
Pan American Games silver medalists for the United States
Sportspeople from Mercer County, New Jersey
Fencers at the 1991 Pan American Games
Fencers at the 1995 Pan American Games
University of North Carolina alumni
People from Robbinsville Township, New Jersey
Medalists at the 1995 Pan American Games
21st-century American Jews